Neuderzhimy was the fourth ship of the  of the Soviet Navy.

Construction and career
The ship was built at Amur Shipbuilding Plant in Komsomolsk-on-Amur and was launched on 31 July 1955 and commissioned into the Pacific Fleet on 30 June 1958.

On May 19, 1966, the ship was reclassified into a Large Missile Ship (BRK), on March 3, 1977 - into a Large Anti-Submarine Ship (BOD).

The squadron (under the command of Rear Admiral Nikolai Ivanovich Khovrin as part of the RRC of the Varyag, Admiral Fokin, Uporny, Neuderzhimy, Vyzyvayushchy and Vesky) The task was set to patrol the area in readiness to protect the state interests of the USSR from provocative actions.

On July 23, 1979, she was delivered for overhaul at Dalzavod, Vladivostok, but on December 8, 1985 it was disarmed and reorganized into a training ship (TCB), and on March 14, 1986, she was renamed into TCB- 567.

In 1992, she was sunk in Truda Bay, Russky Island.

References

Ships built by Amur Shipbuilding Plant
Kildin-class destroyers
1958 ships
Cold War destroyers of the Soviet Union